Frank Charles Schrader (October 6, 1860 – April 1944) was an American geologist, mineralogist, and entomologist.

Born in Sterling, Illinois he received degrees from the University of Kansas (BS and MS) and Harvard University (BA and MA), before teaching at Harvard.

Schrader was one of the first federal geologists to explore Alaska. He was associated with the United States Geological Survey, and did research in several other states, including Arizona, Colorado, Idaho, Kansas, Nevada, and New Mexico.

References

External links
 
 A Guide to the Carson Sink area, Nevada, 85-18. Special Collections, University Libraries, University of Nevada, Reno. Report and maps prepared by Schrader

1860 births
1944 deaths
American geologists
American mineralogists
American entomologists
People from Sterling, Illinois
University of Kansas alumni
Harvard University alumni
Harvard University faculty
United States Geological Survey personnel